The Mysteries is an album composed by John Zorn and performed by Bill Frisell, Carol Emanuel and Kenny Wollesen which was recorded in New York City in December 2012 and released on the Tzadik label in March 2013. The album is the second by the trio following 2012's The Gnostic Preludes.

Reception

Allmusic said  "The Mysteries is another facet of this fine trio's persona as they elegantly yet inquisitively interpret these beautiful pieces by the composer. Their interplay is at such a high level, it feels nearly instinctive." Martin Schray stated "The Mysteries is a very exciting follow-up to The Gnostic Preludes, particularly in its details. And again it is pure joy listening to the outstanding interplay of these master musicians."

Track listing
All compositions by John Zorn
 "Sacred Oracle" – 5:35   
 "Hymn of the Naassenes" – 5:05   
 "Dance of Sappho" – 4:05   
 "The Bacchanalia" – 2:56   
 "Consolamentum" – 5:48   
 "Ode to the Cathars" – 6:55   
 "Apollo" – 3:27   
 "Yaldabaoth" – 3:54   
 "The Nymphs" – 10:47

Personnel
Carol Emanuel – harp
Bill Frisell – guitar 
Kenny Wollesen – vibraphone, bells

Production
Marc Urselli – engineer, audio mixer
John Zorn and Kazunori Sugiyama – producers

References

2013 albums
John Zorn albums
Albums produced by John Zorn
Tzadik Records albums